The first season of Beverly Hills, 90210, an American teen drama television series aired from October 4, 1990, on Fox and concluded on May 9, 1991, after 22 episodes. The series follows twins Brandon and Brenda Walsh during their sophomore year in high school as they deal with everyday teenage issues such as rumors, peer pressure, shoplifting, sex, affirmative action, dysfunctional families, cancer scares, learning disabilities, rape, alcohol abuse, and AIDS.

The series aired Thursdays at 9/8c in the United States averaging 14.2 million viewers a week. Beverly Hills, 90210 was created by Darren Star, who served as executive producer and show runner, and produced by Propaganda Films, 90210 Productions, Torand Productions and Spelling Television. It was released on DVD in 2006 by Paramount Home Entertainment.

Overview
The series follows fraternal twins, Brandon and Brenda Walsh as they move with their parents from Minneapolis, Minnesota to the lavish, and excess filled city of Beverly Hills, California and begin their Sophomore year at West Beverly Hills High School. At first glance, it seems like their rich classmates have it all, but as time goes on, they learn that not everything is what it seems.

Cast

Starring
Jason Priestley as Brandon Walsh  
Shannen Doherty as Brenda Walsh  
Jennie Garth as Kelly Taylor  
Ian Ziering as Steve Sanders 
Gabrielle Carteris as Andrea Zuckerman  
Luke Perry as Dylan McKay  
Brian Austin Green as David Silver  
Douglas Emerson as Scott Scanlon 
Tori Spelling as Donna Martin 
Carol Potter as Cindy Walsh  
James Eckhouse as Jim Walsh

Recurring
Joe E. Tata as Nat Bussichio

Episodes

Reception

Ratings

Reviews
On Metacritic, the first season of Beverly Hills, 90210 scored 46 out of 100, based on nine reviews, indicating "Mixed or average reviews". The season also currently has a 60% rating on Rotten Tomatoes, based on five reviews.

References

1990 American television seasons
1991 American television seasons
Beverly Hills, 90210 seasons